Campillo de Aranda is a municipality located in the province of Burgos, Castile and León, Spain. According to the 2004 census (INE), the municipality has a population of 186 inhabitants.

References

External links
 http://campillodearanda.blogspot.com.es/ - Campillo de Aranda blog about landscapes, traditional architecture and art.

Municipalities in the Province of Burgos